The Tirpitz Museum may refer to:

 Tirpitz Museum (Denmark), focused on the Atlantic Wall in Denmark.
 Tirpitz Museum (Norway), focused on the battleship of same name.